is a Japanese footballer who plays for J2 League club Renofa Yamaguchi, as a striker.

Career
He is the twin brother of Shohei Kishida, who currently plays for Sagan Tosu.

Kishida is a prolific goalscorer. In the 2014 season, he scored 17 goals, becoming the Japan Football League top-scorer.

Club statistics
Updated to January 1, 2022.

References

External links 
 Profile at Renofa Yamaguchi FC 

1990 births
Living people
Fukuoka University alumni
Association football people from Ōita Prefecture
Japanese footballers
J2 League players
J3 League players
Japan Football League players
FC Machida Zelvia players
Renofa Yamaguchi FC players
Iwate Grulla Morioka players
Twin sportspeople
Association football forwards